Tsay Yow-tayn (born 14 October 1968) is a Taiwanese judoka. He competed in the men's half-middleweight event at the 1988 Summer Olympics.

References

1968 births
Living people
Taiwanese male judoka
Olympic judoka of Taiwan
Judoka at the 1988 Summer Olympics
Place of birth missing (living people)